The term external is useful for describing certain algebraic structures. The term comes from the concept of an external binary operation which is a binary operation that draws from some external set. To be more specific, a left external binary operation on S over R is a function  and a right external binary operation on S over R is a function  where S is the set the operation is defined on, and R is the external set (the set the operation is defined over).

Generalizations 

The external concept is a generalization rather than a specialization, and as such, it is different from many terms in mathematics. A similar but opposite concept is that of an internal binary function from R to S, defined as a function . Internal binary functions are like binary functions, but are a form of specialization, so they only accept a subset of the domains of binary functions. Here we list these terms with the function signatures they imply, along with some examples:

  (binary function)
 Example: exponentiation ( as in )
 Examples: matrix multiplication, the tensor product, and the Cartesian product
  (internal binary function)
 Example: internal binary relations
 Example: set membership ( where  is the category of sets)
 Examples: the dot product, the inner product, and metrics
  (external binary operation)
 Examples: dynamical system flows, group actions, projection maps, and scalar multiplication
  (binary operation)
 Examples: addition, multiplication,  permutations, and the cross product

External monoids 

Since monoids are defined in terms of binary operations, we can define an external monoid in terms of external binary operations. For the sake of simplicity, unless otherwise specified, a left external binary operation is implied. Using the term external, we can make the generalizations:

 An external magma  over R is a set S with an external binary operation. This satisfies  for all  (external closure). 

Modules as external rings 

Much of the machinery of modules and vector spaces are fairly straightforward, or discussed above. The only thing not covered yet is their distribution axioms.
  for all  and: 
  for all 

Using these terminology we can make the following local generalizations:

Other examples 

Now that we have all the terminology we need, we can make simple connections between various structures:
 Complex exponentiation forms an external monoid  over the abelian group .
 Prime factorization forests form an external semiring  over the semiring .
 A dynamical system  is an external monoid  over the monoid .
 A semimodule is an external semiring over a semiring.
 A module is an external ring over a ring.
 A vector space is an external ring over a field.

Usefulness 

It could be argued that we already have terms for the concepts described here, like dynamical systems, group actions, modules, and vector spaces. However, there is still no other terminology available for an external monoid for which this terminology gives us a concise expression. Above all else, this is a reason this term should be of use in the mathematical community.

References 

Abstract algebra
Binary operations